Pasi Pihamaa born (17 September 1972) is a Finnish football manager and former player. As a player, he played for Belgian clubs Denderleeuw and Hamme and for English side Billericay Town among others.

Playing career
Pihamaa was born in Helsinki, Finland. He played KäPa, Ponnistus, FC Denderleeuw (Belgium, 1996–97), Hamme (Belgium, 1997–98), PK-35 (1999), Atlantis FC (2000), HIFK Fotboll (2001), Billericay Town (England, 2001–02), FC Honka (2002)

Honours
Atlantis FC
 Kakkoscup: 2003
 Kakkonen South Group and promotion: 2004

References

External links
 
 Profile at Veikkausliiga
 http://www.miestenykkonen.fi/taustasivut/artikkeliarkisto/?num=31682

1972 births
Living people
Finnish footballers
Association football defenders
Ponnistus Helsinki players
Veikkausliiga players
Käpylän Pallo players
Finnish football managers
Atlantis FC managers
Finnish expatriate footballers
Finnish expatriate sportspeople in Belgium
Expatriate footballers in Belgium
Finnish expatriate sportspeople in England
Expatriate footballers in England
Footballers from Helsinki